Dashkevich (/Dashkevych) is a family name of Belarusian or Polish origin. It may refer to one of the following people:

Zmitser Dashkevich, a Belarusian politician
Ostap Dashkevych, a hetman of Ukraine
Vladimir Dashkevich, a Russian composer
Tracy Daszkiewicz, a public health official in Wiltshire, England